Sarah O'Connell (1822?–1870) was a New Zealand runholder. She was born in Mallow, County Cork, Ireland in 1822.

References

1820s births
1870 deaths
People from County Cork
Irish emigrants to New Zealand (before 1923)
New Zealand farmers
New Zealand women farmers
19th-century New Zealand people